Seren Gomer was the first Welsh-language weekly newspaper. The first number was published in 1814 in Swansea by the local Baptist minister and writer Joseph Harris (Gomer).

Publishing history
The weekly was intended to cover news from the whole of Wales and from overseas, as well as literary material. Its success was limited: it went out of business in 1815 after 85 editions, partly due to the heavy tax on newspapers and a shortfall in advertising revenue. In 1818 Harris revived the publication, which became associated with the Baptist denomination. In 1820 it became a monthly. The writer and poet Evan Owen Allen was among its contributors.

When Harris died in 1825, the paper was purchased by a Carmarthen publisher and became a quarterly Baptist magazine. This continued until 1983.

Editors
1951–1975: Lewis Valentine
1975–1977: David Eirwyn Morgan

References

External links
Seren Gomer – the first Welsh weekly at the National Library of Wales

Welsh-language newspapers
Newspapers published in Wales
Publications established in 1814
1814 establishments in Wales
Monthly newspapers